Ledesma is a department of the province of Jujuy (Argentina).

Towns and villages

Towns 

 Libertador General San Martin is the capital of the department of Ledesma

Villages 

 Caimancito
 Calilegua
 Chalicán
 Fraile Pintado

References 

Departments of Jujuy Province